Cristina is a genus of harvestmen in the family Phalangiidae.

Species
 Cristina adenius (Roewer, 1941)
 Cristina bispinifrons Roewer, 1916
 Cristina crassipes Loman, 1902
 Cristina lettowi (Roewer, 1923)
 Cristina pachylomera (Simon, 1879)
 Cristina patellaris (Roewer, 1956)
 Cristina pteronia (Sorensen, 1910)
 Cristina ruandana H. Kauri, 1985
 Cristina somalica (Roewer, 1956)
 Cristina spinosus (C.J.Goodnight & M.L.Goodnight, 1944)
 Cristina subinermis Caporiacco, 1946
 Cristina villiersi (Roewer, 1953)
 Cristina zavattarii Caporiaxxo, 1940

References

Harvestmen